The Powelltown Tramway Rail Trail is a trail developed in the 1970s on the route of the Powelltown Tramway in Victoria, Australia, but has since become overgrown due to lack of maintenance.

References

Rail trails in Victoria (Australia)